is a residential district of southwestern Shibuya, Tokyo, Japan. As of 1 October 2020, it has a population of 2,872 people. Its postal code is 150-0047.

Its nearest stations are Yoyogi-Hachiman, Yoyogi Kōen, Shinsen, Shibuya and Harajuku.

Famous residents include former Japanese prime ministers Shigeru Yoshida and Tarō Asō.

The embassies of Iraq, Jordan, Latvia, Mongolia and New Zealand are in Kamiyama-chō.

Education
 operates public elementary and junior high schools.

Kamiyamacho 4-42 ban are zoned to Jinnan Elementary School (神南小学校) and Shoto Junior High School (松濤中学校), while Kamiyamacho 1-3 and 43-ban are zoned to Tomigaya Elementary School (富谷小学校) and Uehara Junior High School (上原中学校).

References

Neighborhoods of Tokyo
Districts of Shibuya